Byron Joseph Good (born 1944) is an American medical anthropologist primarily studying mental illness. He is currently on the faculty of Harvard University, where he is Professor of Medical Anthropology at Harvard Medical School and Professor of Cultural Anthropology in the Department of Anthropology.

Good has contributed primarily to the field of psychological anthropology, and his writings have explored the cultural meaning of mental illnesses, patient narratives of illness, the epistemic perspective of biomedicine and its treatment of non-Western medical knowledge, and the comparative development of mental health systems. He has conducted his research in Iran, Indonesia, and the United States.

Education
Good holds a B.A. degree from Goshen College and a B.D. in Comparative Study of Religions from Harvard Divinity School. In 1977, he received his Ph.D. in Social Anthropology from the University of Chicago with a thesis entitled "The Heart of What's the Matter: The Structure of Medical Discourse in a Provincial Iranian Town."

Career
At Harvard, Good is co-director of the International Mental Health Training Program, a program funded by the Fogarty International Center. He also co-directed the National Institute of Mental Health Training Program in Culture and Mental Health, at Harvard University,  a postdoctoral program through which psychiatrists and medical anthropologists have been trained in a depth-oriented, culture-conscious and meaning-centered brand of medical and psychological anthropology which Good and his colleagues have cultivated at Harvard for the past few decades.  Together with Arthur Kleinman, Byron Good also convenes the Friday Morning Seminar in Psychological Anthropology and Cultural Psychiatry.

Good served as head of Harvard Medical School's Department of Global Health and Social Medicine from 2000 to 2006. From 1986 to 2004 Byron Good served as editor-in-chief of the international journal Culture, Medicine and Psychiatry.

In 2013-2015 Good served as President of the Society for Psychological Anthropology. Good delivered the 2010 Marett Memorial Lecture at Oxford University.

Research
Good's recent research and studies the development of mental health services in various cultures, and primarily Indonesia, where he has been conducting research and teaching at the Faculty of Medicine, Gadjah Mada University in Yogyakarta over the past two decades. He is principal investigator and co-director of the International Pilot Study of the Onset of Schizophrenia, which is a multi-site research project examining the social and cultural aspects of early phases of psychotic illness in various cultural contexts. Good and his wife, Mary-Jo DelVecchio Good, have also been working with the International Organization for Migration on developing mental health services in Aceh, a region where armed conflict and the 2004 Indian Ocean tsunami have had long-term psychological effects on survivors.

Good's contributions to anthropological theory concern the concept of subjectivity in contemporary societies — specifically addressing the convergence of political, cultural, and psychological dimensions in subjective experience—and with a special focus on Indonesian cultural, political and historical context. He has specifically investigated the ways in which culture and social processes shape the onset, the experience, and the course of psychotic illness, and the ways in which this relationship is embedded in and shaped by local, historical, and political contexts.

Selected publications

Books
 1994. Good, Byron J.  Medicine, Rationality and Experience:  An Anthropological Perspective.  Cambridge:  Cambridge University Press. (Translated and published in French, Italian, Spanish, Japanese, and Chinese.)

Edited volumes
 1985. Kleinman, Arthur and Byron Good, editors. Culture and Depression: Studies in the Anthropology and Cross‑Cultural Psychiatry of Affect and Disorder. Comparative Studies of Health Systems and Medical Care Series. Los Angeles: University of California Press. 
 1992. Good, Mary-Jo D., Paul Brodwin, Byron J. Good, and Arthur Kleinman, eds. Pain as Human Experience:  An Anthropological Perspective. Berkeley:  U. of California Press. 
 1995. Desjarlais, Robert, Leon Eisenberg, Byron J. Good, and Arthur Kleinman. World Mental Health:  Problems and Priorities in Low Income Countries.  New York:  Oxford University Press. 
 2004. Shweder, Richard and Byron J. Good, eds. Clifford Geertz by his Colleagues.  Chicago:  University of Chicago Press. (Translated into Indonesian.) 
 2005. Giarelli, Guido, Mary-Jo DelVecchio Good, Byron Good, eds.  Clinical Hermeneutics.  Bologna, Italy (in Italian only). 
 2007. Biehl, Joao, Byron J. Good, and Arthur Kleinman, eds. Subjectivity: Ethnographic Investigations.  University of California Press. 
 2008. Good, Mary-Jo DelVecchio, Sandra Hyde, Sarah Pinto, and Byron Good, eds. Postcolonial Disorders.  University of California Press. 
 2009. Hinton, Devon and Byron Good, eds.  Culture and Panic Disorder.  Palo Alto: CA Stanford University Press. 
 2010. Good, Byron J., Michael Fischer, Sarah Willen, Mary-Jo Good.  A Reader in Medical Anthropology: Theoretical Trajectories, Emergent Realities. Wiley-Blackwell Publishers. 
 2015. Devon Hinton and Byron Good, eds. Culture and PTSD. Philadelphia: University of Pennsylvania Press.

References

External links
 Byron Good's Faculty Page at Harvard Medical School
 A Biographical Interview With Byron J. Good
 The 2010 Marett Lecture by Professor Byron J. Good

Psychological anthropologists
University of Chicago alumni
Harvard Medical School faculty
Living people
Harvard Divinity School alumni
Medical anthropologists
1944 births
Goshen College alumni